El Wak or Elwak may refer to:

 El Wak, Kenya, a town
 El Wak, Somalia, a city
 El Wak District, Somalia